John Emmanuel "Joe" Astley (April 1899 – October 1967) was an English footballer. His regular position was at full back. He was born in Dudley, Worcestershire. He played for Manchester United, Cradley Heath, and Notts County.

External links
MUFCInfo.com profile

1899 births
1967 deaths
English footballers
Manchester United F.C. players
Notts County F.C. players
Sportspeople from Dudley
Cradley Heath F.C. players
Association football fullbacks